Malek Mosque (Also called Imam mosque, Persian: مسجد ملک) This mosque is located in Kerman, Iran. The mosque was built at the time of Turan Shah I, Kerman Seljuk Sultanate, in the 11th century. This mosque is the biggest and oldest mosque in Kerman.

Gallery

References 

Mosques in Iran
Mosque buildings with domes
Tourist attractions in Kerman Province
Buildings and structures in Kerman Province
National works of Iran